The Haarlem Baseball Week (before 2016 known as ) is an international invitation baseball tournament at the  in Haarlem, Netherlands.

In December 2016, a few months after the 28th edition of the event, the organisation of the tournament announced that this had been the last edition and that there would be no new editions due to financial problems. A workgroup was formed to find sponsors in order to realise a relaunch, which succeeded after several companies and the municipality of Haarlem guaranteed an amount that would cover the costs of at least three new editions.

The 2018 Haarlem Baseball Week, the 29th edition of the event, was won by Japan, their fourth title. The 2020 edition of the tournament was cancelled as a result of the COVID-19 pandemic.

Results

Medal table

Tournament awards

Homerun King
Most Popular Player
Press Award
Best Defensive Player
Best Hitter
Best Pitcher
Most Valuable Player

See also
World Port Tournament
Baseball awards#World
Baseball in the Netherlands

References

External links
Honkbalweek Haarlem official website (Dutch)
Honkbalweek Haarlem official website (English)

 
Haarlem
Recurring sporting events established in 1961